Sphaeroma pulchellum is a species of isopod in the family Sphaeromatidae. It can be found in the Black Sea where it curls into small spheres on the sandy benthos.

References

Sphaeromatidae
Fauna of the Black Sea